General elections were held in Mexico in 1876. Incumbent president Sebastián Lerdo de Tejada was re-elected with over 90% of the vote. However, he was removed from office by the end of the year as a result of the Plan of Tuxtepec.

Results

President

References

Mexico
President
Presidential elections in Mexico
Election and referendum articles with incomplete results